"Lê Lê Lê" is a 2011 song by Brazilian sertanejo duo João Neto & Frederico. It was a pre-release from their 2012 live album and DVD Ao Vivo em Palmas(Live from Palmas).
Already their biggest hit for them in Brazil and Latin markets in 2011, it gained big popularity on European dance charts in 2012, including in Spain, Portugal, France, Netherlands, UK.

It was re-released by BIP Records in May 2014 for major European markets charting in the Netherlands and Belgium.

Appearances
Besides the live album Ao Vivo em Palmas, "Lê Lê Lê" has appeared in a great number of Latin-inspired dance compilations including:

2012
Été 2012 (Smart)
Ritmo latino [2012] (Polystar)
Hot Latina 2012 (EMI)
¡Tacatá! The Latin Hits 2012 Vol. 2 (Universal)

2013
Zumba Fitness – Dance Party 2 (Universal)
The Dome Vol. 65 (Polystar)
Let's Dance – Das Tanzalbum 2013 (Polystar)
Clubfete 2013.02 (Ballhaus)
Die Hit-Giganten – Best of Sommerhits (Sony)
2014
RTL II präsentiert: Ritmo do Brasil (Polystar)
MNM Big Hits 2014 Vol. 2 (Warner)
Hitzone 10 (Sony)

Track list
Europe
"Lê Lê Lê" (radio edit) (2:39) – (BIP / BIP-Club-644)

In popular culture
"Lê Lê Lê" was used as a theme song for the telenovela series Cheias de Charme in 2012.

Charts

Weekly charts

Year-end charts

References

2011 singles
2014 singles
Portuguese-language songs
2011 songs